Catamenia may refer to:

 Catamenia (band), the Finnish melodic black metal band
 Catamenia, the female menstrual cycle, female period 
 Catamenia (bird), a genus of birds in the family Thraupidae